Numerous festivals, shows and exhibitions are held annually in Toronto. They include:

January

Winterlicious
Toronto Design Offsite Festival
Toronto Design Week

February

Canadian International AutoShow - at the Metro Convention Centre
Winter City

March
Cinéfranco
St Patrick's Day Parade
Canadian Music Week

April

Sporting Life 10K
Hot Docs
Khalsa Day parade, first held in 1986
Toronto Fashion Week

May

Cabbagetown Forsythia Festival - Held the first Sunday in May.
Doors Open Toronto
Science Rendezvous
Anime North - Usually held the weekend following Victoria Day, although some times during the long weekend.
Toronto Comic Arts Festival at Toronto Reference Library

June

Luminato a festival of arts and creativity established in 2007
North by Northeast, an annual five-day live music and film festival and music conference
Pride Week a large gay pride festival
Toronto Downtown Jazz Festival - various indoors and located throughout the downtown core
MuchMusic Video Awards
Toronto International Dragon Boat Festival - Centre Island
Fête de la Musique (World Music Day) - June 21 annually.  Musicians from all over the world perform free concerts throughout the city
VRTO Virtual & Augmented Reality World Conference & Expo - a virtual reality conference that takes place the 3rd week of June, annually.
World Naked Bike Ride, annually since June 2004.

July

Toronto Fringe Festival, Toronto's largest theatre festival
Honda Indy Toronto at Exhibition Place
Caribana is North America's largest street festival, showcasing Caribbean/West Indian culture (in some years early August).
Beaches International Jazz Festival - The Beaches
Summerlicious
ConBravo! fandom convention
Brickfete LEGO Fan Festival
Rogers Cup - An ATP World Tour Masters 1000 and WTA Tour Premier 5 tennis tournament held annually since 1881.

August
The Canadian National Exhibition (CNE, or "the Ex").
The Taste of the Danforth festival showcases the mostly Greek culture of The Danforth and has expanded to include other cultures of the area.
Fan Expo Canada

September

The Canadian International Air Show -off CNE grounds over Lake Ontario
The Terry Fox Run
The Toronto International Film Festival is considered one of the big three global film events, with Cannes and Berlin, with more screens and more films than either.
Cabbagetown Fall Festival, - Held the second weekend in September.
FIVARS Festival of International Virtual & Augmented Reality Stories  third week September
Virgin Festival, based on the British festival
Word on the Street -  Canada's largest, annual outdoor book and magazine festival
Taste of the Kingsway - A celebration of food and music, the Taste of the Kingsway festival is a family-friendly way to honour the community.

October

Nuit Blanche
The Toronto Waterfront Marathon - One of just five IAAF Gold Label marathons in North America, run along the waterfront starting and ending in downtown Toronto
The Toronto After Dark Film Festival

November

The Canadian FinTech Awards. An annual Gala Awards Dinner to celebrate Canadian Innovation, which was started in 2015.
The Toronto Santa Claus Parade (Started in 1904 with just a single float, it now boasts 32 floats, 24 bands, and 2000 participants. It is one of the biggest productions in North America, and broadcast to many countries around the world.)
Cavalcade of Lights.
The Royal Agricultural Winter Fair, an annual fall fair started in 1922.

December

Reviving the Islamic Spirit

See also

List of Asian events in Toronto

References

External links
Toronto Festivals & Events Directory
Event listings

 
Annual events
 

Lists of annual events